San Pablo River can refer to:
 San Pablo River (Ecuador)
 San Pablo River (Panama)
 San Pablo River (Florida), part of the Intracoastal Waterway